Mehestan New City, with the former name of Hashtgerd New City, is in the Central District of Savojbolagh County, Alborz province. Located in the vicinity of Hashtgerd, it was built in recent years. As of the most recent census in 2016, its population was 42,147 in 13,622 households.

According to the census of Iran Statistics Center, the population of the new city of Mehestan in 2018 was equal to 49,417 people. The population in June 1399 is equal to 60,866 people, and in September 1400 it is equal to 85,200 people.[1] According to the comprehensive plan of Hashtgerd, the population capacity of this city is more than 500,000 people, which enables the development of the city up to 1 million people. In addition, the area of ​​this city will reach 8 thousand hectares from the current 4,800 hectares at the end of the fourth development plan.[4]

History 

The plan to create new cities in order to respond to the widespread need for housing and to prevent car cities in the urban area of metropolises was put forward as a policy and a serious necessity in the government's agenda. At the end of 1364, the government board approved and notified the transfer of 16,000 hectares of land from Fashand village to the Ministry of Housing and Urban Development for the creation of satellite cities. The Ministry of Housing and Urban Development was responsible for the implementation of this plan, and the location and acquisition of land and the preparation, design and implementation of it through the New Cities Construction Company and its subsidiaries were continuously followed up.

In 1367, a contract was signed with various Iranian consulting engineers for the preparation of study plans and comprehensive plans for several new cities in the urban area of Tehran. In 1368, the creation of these cities and their location was approved by the Supreme Council of Urban Planning, and the new city of Hashtgerd with 500,000 people in the western axis is one of these cities.[2]

In 1370, the Supreme Council of Architecture and Urban Development entrusted the implementation of this plan to Hashtgerd New City Development Company.

In 1401, the name of this city was changed from the new city of Hashtgerd to the new city of Mehestan.[3]

New city studies 

The location studies for the new city of Mehestan were assigned to consulting engineers in 1366, and the Tehran-Qazvin axis was recognized as the first priority and the most suitable development axis.

In 1367, the studies of the new city of Mehestan were assigned to the consulting engineers of Shahrsaz (as the main consulting engineer and coordinator) in the three fields of prerequisite, strategic and comprehensive plan. At the same time, the studies of transportation (inside and outside the city) and city facilities were started with other consulting engineers, and based on various statistics and information, the preparation of various population and employment forecasting models was finally prepared and presented. The proposed pattern of urban development was matched with the patterns and options suggested by transportation and urban facilities consultants and the final pattern of city development was determined with some changes. The development model of the city was integrated with the geographical and physical condition of the lands of the new city and its surroundings, and based on the general design goals and criteria, the preliminary plan and the comprehensive plan of the new city of Mehestan were prepared.[2]

Reasons for choosing the region 

The main factors considered in choosing the new city of Mehestan are:

The optimal distance between New City and Tehran (65 km from Tehran-Qazvin highway). Not so far that the attraction of Tehran region does not exist in the city and not so close that it is connected to Tehran in the form of continuous development.

The slope is acceptable for urban development and the soil is suitable for the establishment of tall structures

Proper access to water sources: underground water, water from nearby dams such as Taleghan Dam

Suitable geographical and natural situation, moderate mountain climate

Good distance to big cities around

near Alborz mountain range

Location and communication

Access to the new city of Mehestan is provided through the Karaj-Qazvin freeway, which will be connected to the city by three non-level intersections in the future. In addition, the presence of the Tehran-Qazvin Expressway and the national railway in the south of the old city of Hashtgerd, as well as the continuation of the Tehran Hashtgerd high-speed electric railway (Line 5 of the Tehran Metro), are among the access points of this city.

Hashtgerd metro station

Geography 

The new city of Mehestan is located on the southern slope of the Alborz Mountains and the northern edge of the central desert of Iran, and in terms of climate, it is located between the mountainous climate and the semi-arid and arid interior climate. In terms of general classification, the climate of this region is of Mediterranean type.

The new city of Mehestan is geographically located in the west of Alborz province at an altitude of 1,310 to 1,610 meters above sea level and between longitudes of 50 degrees 25 minutes and 50 degrees 55 minutes and latitudes of 35 degrees 45 minutes and 36 degrees 5 minutes. Hashtgerd plain generally has cold winters and hot and dry summers, but the amount of heat is not the same in all parts of the plain and its amount decreases in the mountainous areas.

The temperature of the new city of Mehestan usually varies between (-16) degrees Celsius in winter and (38) degrees Celsius in summer; And compared to Tehran, it is usually between 3 and 6 degrees cooler. The maximum relative humidity in the region is close to 80% and the annual average is about 49%.

Due to the mountainous nature of the Hashtgerd region, this region has sufficient rainfall during the rainy season. The average annual rainfall for 35 consecutive years is 373 mm.

Overall structure of the city 

Shahrjadid Mehstan highway

The new city of Mehestan consists of two main residential and industrial parts.

The industrial sector with an area of ​​about 200 hectares is located in the south of the highway. This section is designed to provide employment for the new city and prevent the city from becoming a dormitory. It is expected that the employment sector will be developed up to 350 hectares. The units located in this sector are mainly divided into two groups:

Machine units, molding, fine industries and computers

National units that can be established in Tehran province

At present, land has been assigned to 160 industrial units that have the approval in principle from the Ministry of Industries and the necessary license from the Environmental Organization. The number of units in the production line is about 50 units and the built units are 45 units.

Mayors

Mashallah Izadiyar

Mojtaba Askari

Ibrahim Khalili

Kamran Azimzadeh (for 6 years)[5]

Mohammad Aghaei Meybadi (temporary supervisor of the municipality)[6]

Seyyed Masoud Bozorgzadeh

Nasser Amir Kamali (temporary supervisor of the municipality)

Asghar Aghaei

Nasser Amir Kamali (supervisor of the municipality) [7]

Mohsen Majzoub

Footnote

  "Census results of Iran in 2005". National portal of statistics. Archived from the original on 21 November 1392.

  "Introducing the new city of Hashtgerd". Electronic city portal. Archived from the original on August 5, 2011.

  1050 (2022-04-14). "The new city of Hashtgerd in the west of Alborz province was renamed to "Mehstan". Irena. Received on 2022-05-30.

  Mahdis Farqani (December 29, 2006). "New Cheap Octagon". the world of economy. Archived from the original on 27 January 2013.

  http://www.irna.ir/fa/News/80897562/

  http://alborz.isna.ir/Default.aspx?NSID=5&SSLID=46&NID=12983

  "Hashtgerd New City Municipality". Hashtgerdnc.ir. Received on 11-24-2020.

References 

Savojbolagh County

Districts of Alborz Province

Populated places in Alborz Province

Populated places in Savojbolagh County